This is a list of albums released by Walt Disney Records, including studio albums, soundtrack albums, compilation albums, and remix albums released by the label. Disney licensed its music to other labels from 1937 to 1956. The company started publishing its own music under Disneyland Records in 1956, eventually also adopting the Buena Vista label in 1959 for albums aimed at a slightly more adult audience and price-point (such as music from their live-action Westerns). In 1989, Disneyland Records was renamed to its current branding, Walt Disney Records.

Albums

1940s

1950s

1960s

1970s

1980s

1990s

2000s

2010s

2020s

See also 

 Hollywood Records discography
 Lists of albums

Notes

References

Discography
Disney
Film soundtracks
Disney